Nerve is a 2013 Australian psychological thriller film directed by Sebastien Guy. It stars Christian Clark and Georgina Haig.

Plot
After suffering a breakdown due to the death of his wife in a car accident, Jakob Evans tries to find closure in confronting her lover. Helped by the lost and troubled Grace, Jakob's search transforms from finding closure to obsession and revenge. While forced to face his own failings, Grace realizes all is not what it seems.

Cast
Christian Clark as Jakob Evans
Georgina Haig as Grace
Craig Hall as Vincent Gregory
Gary Sweet as Ben Livingston
Andrea Demetriades as Helen White
Denise Roberts as Sally Livingston
Cameron Daddo as Darren Anderson
Sara Wiseman as Jennifer
Silvia Colloca as Elena
Paul Winchester as Dr. Stevens

Accolades

References

External links
 
 Official Nerve (film) website 

2013 films
Australian psychological drama films
Films shot in Sydney
2010s English-language films
2010s Australian films